Golimumab is a human monoclonal antibody which is used as an immunosuppressive medication and sold under the brand name Simponi. Golimumab targets tumor necrosis factor alpha (TNF-alpha), a pro-inflammatory molecule and hence is a TNF inhibitor. Profound reduction in C-reactive protein (CRP) levels, interleukin (IL)-6, intercellaular adhesion molecules (ICAM)-1, matrix metalloproteinase (MMP)-3, and vascular endothelial growth factor (VEGF) demonstrates golimumab as an effective modulator of inflammatory markers and bone metabolism.

It is on the World Health Organization's List of Essential Medicines.

Golimumab was developed by Janssen Biotech, Inc. (formerly Centocor Biotech, Inc.) which also markets the product in the United States. The Janssen Pharmaceutical Companies market Simponi in Canada, Central and South America, the Middle East, Africa and Asia Pacific. In Europe, Russia and Turkey, Simponi distribution rights are held by Schering-Plough (Ireland) Company, a subsidiary of Merck & Co., Inc. In Japan, Indonesia and Taiwan, distribution rights are held by Mitsubishi Tanabe Pharma Corporation.

Development
Golimumab binds to both soluble and transmembrane forms of TNFα. The antibody was isolated from a hybridoma clone produced by transgenic mice immunized with human TNFα. The golimumab-secreting clone was selected after being assayed for human light and heavy chains and TNFα-binding. The commercial product is produced in a recombinant cell line cultured by continuous perfusion.

Uses : Approvals and indications
The European Medicines Agency (EMA) has approved the use of golimumab as a treatment for rheumatoid arthritis, psoriatic arthritis and ankylosing spondylitis. Golimumab was approved for the treatment by the US Food and Drug Administration (FDA) as well as the European Medicines Agency (EMA) in 2013 for the treatment of ulcerative colitis. Golimumab can either be used via a self administered subcutaneous injection or intravenous injection.

Golimumab is approved in Canada and the United States as a once monthly subcutaneous treatment for adults with moderately to severely active rheumatoid arthritis, psoriatic arthritis, juvenile idiopathic arthritis and ankylosing spondylitis.

Research

Rheumatoid arthritis 
Large, double-blind randomized controlled trials in patients with rheumatoid arthritis have shown that golimumab in combination with methotrexate was more effective than methotrexate alone. When clinically indicated, golimumab is estimated as a moderate cost-effective treatment option. National Institutes for Health and Care Excellence (NICE) stated that treatment with golimumab is recommended for RA patients who have failed prior TNFi treatment. Unlike other TNFi treatments such as adalimumab and certolizumab pegol, there have been no reported cases of drug-induced lupus-like syndrome (DILS).

Uveitis 
There is preliminary evidence for golimumab as a treatment option for ocular inflammation.

References

External links 
 

Johnson & Johnson brands
Janssen Biotech
Schering-Plough brands
Merck & Co. brands
TNF inhibitors
Monoclonal antibodies
World Health Organization essential medicines